1269 Rollandia, provisional designation , is a dark Hildian asteroid from the outermost region of the asteroid belt, approximately  in diameter. It was discovered on 20 September 1930, by Soviet astronomer Grigory Neujmin at the Simeiz Observatory on the Crimean peninsula. The asteroid was named after French writer Romain Rolland. The D-type asteroid has a rotation period of 17.4 hours. It was one of the last 100-kilometer sized asteroids discovered in the main belt.

Orbit and classification 

Rollandia is a member of the orbital Hilda group, which stay in a 3:2 orbital resonance with Jupiter and are located in the outermost main belt. It is however not a member of the collisional Hilda family but a non-family asteroid of the background population when applying the hierarchical clustering method to its proper orbital elements.

Rollandia orbits the Sun at a distance of 3.5–4.3 AU once every 7 years and 9 months (2,816 days; semi-major axis of 3.9 AU). Its orbit has an eccentricity of 0.10 and an inclination of 3° with respect to the ecliptic.

Naming 

This minor planet was named after French writer Romain Rolland (1866–1944), who was awarded the Nobel Prize in Literature in 1915 (see list). The official  was mentioned in The Names of the Minor Planets by Paul Herget in 1955.

Physical characteristics 

In the Tholen classification, Rollandia is a D-type asteroid. This spectral type is common among outermost asteroids and Jupiter trojans and is known for its very low albedo (see below).

Rotation period 

In August 2016, a rotational lightcurve of Rollandia was obtained from photometric observations by Brian Warner, Robert Stephens and Dan Coley at the Center for Solar System Studies at Landers, California. Analysis gave a bimodal lightcurve with a rotation period of 19.98 hours and a low brightness amplitude of 0.06 magnitude. An alternative monomodal period solution of 9.99 hours is also possible, and becomes more likely if the object is nearly spheroidal. In April 2019, Warner re-visited the object an obtained a period of 17.36 hours. This result supersedes previous observations that gave a period of 15.32, 15.4 and 30.98 hours, respectively.

Diameter and albedo 

According to the surveys carried out by the Japanese Akari satellite, the Infrared Astronomical Satellite IRAS, and the NEOWISE mission of NASA's Wide-field Infrared Survey Explorer, Rollandia measures between 104.893 and 107.85 kilometers in diameter and its surface has an albedo between 0.045 and 0.048.

The Collaborative Asteroid Lightcurve Link adopts the results obtained by IRAS, that is, an albedo of 0.0473 and a diameter of 105.19 kilometers based on an absolute magnitude of 8.82. Based on current estimates, Rollandia was the penultimate asteroid discovered in the outer asteroid belt that was larger than 100 kilometers. The last such body was 1390 Abastumani (101 km), discovered in 1935.

Notes

References

External links 
 Asteroid Lightcurve Database (LCDB), query form (info )
 Dictionary of Minor Planet Names, Google books
 Asteroids and comets rotation curves, CdR – Observatoire de Genève, Raoul Behrend
 Discovery Circumstances: Numbered Minor Planets (1)-(5000) – Minor Planet Center
 
 

001269
Discoveries by Grigory Neujmin
Named minor planets
001269
19300920